Yume Nikki: Dream Diary is a 2018 adventure horror game developed by Kadokawa Games and published by Playism. A reboot of Yume Nikki, the player controls a girl named Madotsuki and explores six worlds inside her dreams. Unlike its predecessor, it contains platforming and puzzle gameplay elements; the game is also rendered in 3D and is seen from a third-person perspective.

Dream Diary is a reboot of the 2004 game Yume Nikki, and was produced under supervision of the original game's creator Kikiyama. It was released for Windows on February 23, 2018, and for Nintendo Switch on February 21, 2019. The game received mixed reviews from critics, who complimented the music and atmosphere but criticized its puzzles and linearity; they generally felt that it did not live up to the quality of the original game.

Gameplay

In Yume Nikki: Dream Diary, the player controls a hikikomori named Madotsuki (窓付き, lit. windowed) at home in her apartment, the only place she can be when awake. In her apartment, she has a game console which allows players to access a retro-style mini game called Super Nasu. On her desk is a diary which keeps track of all collectible concept art found by the player. After Madotsuki falls to sleep, she begins to dream. The player is then presented with a dream world which resembles the same room Madotsuki lives in. In the dream world, the player is able to leave the room, which will lead to a nexus of 6 doors, half of the 12 in the original game, which lead to surrealist worlds that seem to be twisted versions of the real world, including an abandoned playground and a shopping mall. The objective of the game is to collect five items, known as "effects", to finish the game. The player can choose to wake from the dream world at any time, by causing Madotsuki to pinch her cheek and awaken. This behavior ensures that the player has a way out of the dream world at all times.

There is no way to encounter a game over in the game, though enemies do exist in the form of NPCs that can teleport the player to previous checkpoints, forcing them to redo sections of the game. Such NPCs include bird-like humanoid girls with beaks for mouths, called "Toriningen", who will chase after Madotsuki.

Development and release 
Dream Diary predecessor, Yume Nikki, was created independently and released as freeware in June 2004 by a Japanese developer using the pseudonym Kikiyama. After 2011, there was no update from Kikiyama until Yume Nikki was published on Steam in January 2018. Coincident with the Steam release, a two-week countdown began on the Kadokawa Corporation website, accompanied by a message indicating an unspecified Yume Nikki project was being produced. At the end of the countdown, Dream Diary was revealed to be in development at Kadokawa Games and a release date was announced. According to the game's publisher, Playism, it was produced with supervision and cooperation from Kikiyama. Dream Diary incorporated influences from contemporary indie games as well as characters from Yume Nikki. The developers also reportedly included abandoned design concepts from the original game. Shortly before the game's release, Playism announced that it would feature a collaboration with Ao Oni, another freeware horror game.

Dream Diary was released for Windows on February 23, 2018, and for Nintendo Switch on February 21, 2018.

Reception
Yume Nikki: Dream Diary received a score of 51/100 on review aggregate site Metacritic, indicating "mixed or average reviews".

Adam Smith of Rock Paper Shotgun lambasted the world designs, which tried to evoke the sense of the original game's, comparing them to "bootleg DVD covers" and saying that they were not "particularly [surreal] or dream-like". He also criticized the gameplay for being clunky and confusing at points. In comparison to the original, he felt Dream Diary had lost all of its "mysterious horror and charm".

Chris Shive of Hardcore Gamer rated the game 2.5/5 points, calling the visuals a "major strong point" of the game, such as unsettling environments and interesting creature designs. Because of these aspects, he felt the game successfully recreated the "chaotic and random" feel of dreams. Despite the interesting premise and strong visuals, he felt the game was not very enjoyable to play, citing the linear world layouts and weak puzzles as contributing factors.

Kevin Lynn of Adventure Gamers rated the game 2.5/5 stars, identifying the game's atmosphere, particularly its music, as a strong point, and noting that it helped contribute to a "lonely, haunting tone". He said the game stands out in its world variety, but that the locations lost their impact due to excessive backtracking, which he criticized along with the game's "tiresome" animations. For the most part, he found the controls responsive, but criticized one section of 3D platforming for its camera and buggy physics. He said that the game had discarded the distinct open-ended design of the original Yume Nikki, opting instead for adventure platformer tropes, but that it did a good job of updating the original 2D visuals.

Notes

References

External links 
 

2018 video games
Adventure games
Nintendo Switch games
Single-player video games
Video games about nightmares
Video games developed in Japan
Windows games
2010s horror video games
Playism games